Vernon is a town in Windham County, Vermont, in the United States. The population was 2,192 at the 2020 census. Vernon is the site of the now-defunct Vermont Yankee, the state of Vermont's only nuclear power plant, which closed in December 2014.

History
The town was chartered in 1672 as part of the Massachusetts Grant. In 1736 the area was granted by Massachusetts as part of Fall Town, and in 1753 the area was granted as Hinsdale. When the Connecticut River was established as a boundary, two separate towns were created: Hinsdale, New Hampshire and Hinsdale, Vermont. The people who lived in Hinsdale, Vermont wanted a separate name, and in 1802 the Vermont legislature changed the town's name to Vernon. The name is said to have been chosen after President George Washington's plantation home, Mount Vernon.

Fort Bridgman, in Vernon, was burned in 1755, a casualty of the French and Indian War.

Geography
Vernon lies on the southern and eastern Vermont borders, north of Franklin County, Massachusetts, and west of Cheshire County, New Hampshire. The town is bordered by Brattleboro to the north, Guilford to the west, Hinsdale, New Hampshire, to the east, and the towns of Bernardston, Massachusetts, and Northfield, Massachusetts to the south.

Climate
This climatic region is typified by large seasonal temperature differences, with warm to hot (and often humid) summers and cold (sometimes severely cold) winters. According to the Köppen Climate Classification system, Vernon has a humid continental climate, abbreviated "Dfb" on climate maps.

Demographics

As of the census of 2000, there were 2,141 people, 741 households, and 574 families living in the town. The racial makeup of the town was 98.60% White, 0.28% African American, 0.19% Native American, 0.14% Asian, 0.05% Pacific Islander, and 0.75% from two or more races. Hispanic or Latino of any race were 0.84% of the population.

There were 741 households, out of which 37.5% had children under the age of 18 living with them, 66.7% were married couples living together, 7.3% had a female householder with no husband present, and 22.5% were non-families. 17.7% of all households were made up of individuals, and 6.6% had someone living alone who was 65 years of age or older. The average household size was 2.76 and the average family size was 3.12.

In the town, the population was spread out, with 27.2% under the age of 18, 5.5% from 18 to 24, 27.7% from 25 to 44, 26.2% from 45 to 64, and 13.5% who were 65 years of age or older. The median age was 39 years. For every 100 females, there were 100.8 males. For every 100 females age 18 and over, there were 92.6 males.

The median income for a household in the town was $49,688, and the median income for a family was $55,625. Males had a median income of $35,845 versus $25,139 for females. The per capita income for the town was $19,720. About 2.5% of families and 2.8% of the population were below the poverty line, including 3.3% of those under age 18 and 2.0% of those age 65 or over.

Education
Vernon is served by the Windham Southeast Supervisory Union. Vernon Elementary School is a public school located in Vernon and serves kindergarten to sixth grade. There is one public middle school, the Brattleboro Area Middle School (BAMS), and one public high school, the Brattleboro Union High School (BUHS). There is also a career development center, the Windham Regional Career Center.

Notable people 

 Karen Carroll, Justice of the Vermont Supreme Court
 George Howe, State's Attorney of Windham County, United States Attorney for Vermont, member of the Vermont Senate
 Jonathan Hunt, US congressman

Vermont Yankee nuclear power plant

The town is the site of the now-closed Vermont Yankee nuclear power plant, which shut down on December 29, 2014.

References

External links
 

 Town of Vernon official website
 City-Data.com

	

 
Towns in Vermont
Vermont populated places on the Connecticut River
Towns in Windham County, Vermont